DET, also known under its chemical name N,N-diethyltryptamine and as T-9, is a psychedelic drug closely related to DMT and 4-HO-DET. However, despite its structural similarity to DMT, its activity is induced by an oral dose of around 50–100 mg, without the aid of MAO inhibitors, and the effects last for about 2–4 hours.

Chemistry
DET is an analogue of the common tryptamine hallucinogen N,N-Dimethyltryptamine or DMT.

Pharmacology

The mechanism of action is thought to be serotonin receptor agonism, much like other classic psychedelics.

DET is sometimes preferred over DMT because it can be taken orally, whereas DMT cannot. This is because the enzyme monoamine oxidase degrades DMT into an inactive compound before it is absorbed. To overcome this, it must be administered in a different manner, i.e. intravenously, intramuscularly, by inhalation, by insufflation, rectally, or by ingestion along with an inhibitor of monoamine oxidase. Because DET has ethyl groups attached to its nitrogen atom, monoamine oxidase is unable to degrade it. This is also true for many other tryptamines with larger nitrogen substituents.

Biochemistry
Although DET is a synthetic compound with no known natural sources, it has been used in conjunction with the mycelium of Psilocybe cubensis to produce the synthetic chemicals 4-PO-DET (Ethocybin) and 4-HO-DET (Ethocin), as opposed to the naturally occurring 4-PO-DMT (Psilocybin) and 4-HO-DMT (Psilocin). Isolation of the alkaloids resulted in 3.3% 4-HO-DET and 0.01-0.8% 4-PO-DET.

Psychosis model
Early studies of DET as well as other psychedelics were focused on their presumed psychotomimetic properties. Researchers theorized that abnormal metabolites of endogenous chemicals such as tryptamine, serotonin, and tryptophan could be the explanation for mental disorders  such as schizophrenia, or psychosis. With the progression of science and pharmacological understanding, this belief has been dismissed by most researchers.

Legal status
Internationally DET is a Schedule I drug under the Convention on Psychotropic Substances.

Australia
DET is considered a Schedule 9 prohibited substance in Australia under the Poisons Standard (October 2015). A Schedule 9 substance is a substance which may be abused or misused, the manufacture, possession, sale or use of which should be prohibited by law except when required for medical or scientific research, or for analytical, teaching or training purposes with approval of Commonwealth and/or State or Territory Health Authorities.

See also 
 TiHKAL
 5-MeO-DET
 4-PO-DET (Ethocybin)
 Machine Elves

References

External links 
 Erowid DET Vault
 DET entry in TiHKAL
 DET entry in TiHKAL • info

Psychedelic tryptamines
Designer drugs
Serotonin receptor agonists
Diethylamino compounds